The Citadel Bulldogs basketball team represents The Citadel in Charleston, South Carolina in the sport of men's college basketball. The program is classified in the NCAA's Division I, and the team competes in the Southern Conference South Division. Ed Conroy is in his second stint as the head coach, having previously held the position from 2006–2010.

The team has never won a regular season or Southern Conference men's basketball tournament championship or participated in the NCAA Tournament. Following Northwestern's 2017 NCAA Tournament bid, they are one of four schools playing Division I basketball at the time of the first NCAA basketball tournament to have never made an NCAA Tournament. The team has made one postseason appearance, playing in the 2009 CollegeInsider.com Postseason Tournament, falling in the first round to eventual champion Old Dominion.  In 1927 the Bulldogs claimed the Southern Intercollegiate Athletic Association Tournament title, defeating Mercer for their only conference championship.

The Citadel does not field a women's basketball team.

Facilities
The Bulldogs play their home games at the on-campus McAlister Field House, a 6,000 seat arena formerly known as The Armory. The arena was heavily renovated in 1989. During the summer of 2011, The Citadel completed additional renovations to the Field House, building a new floor and revamping the Bulldogs locker room. Like all Citadel athletic teams, the Bulldogs utilize strength and conditioning, medical, and video spaces in Seignious Hall.

Notable Bulldogs
Regan Truesdale - Two-time Southern Conference Men's Basketball Player of the Year
Art Musselman - played in the shadow of Jerry West for three years
Pat Conroy - author famous, in part, for chronicling his life as a Citadel basketball player in the novels My Losing Season and The Lords of Discipline.

Honored jerseys
The Citadel created the honored jersey in 2009, beginning with Les Robinson. Banners hang in McAlister Field House for each honored jersey.  Since Robinson, four additional jerseys have been added. Pat Conroy's jersey was honored most recently, on February 3, 2018.

Coaches
Below is a list of all coaches at The Citadel and their records through the 2020–21 season.

Rivalries
The primary Bulldog rivals, as in other sports, are VMI, Furman, and College of Charleston. The Citadel also has historical rivalries with other schools within the state.  The Bulldogs' records versus each rival are listed below, through the 2020–21 season.

Records vs rivals

Records vs conference rivals
Excludes Furman and VMI, listed above
East Tennessee State, Mercer and VMI become SoCon members in basketball for the 2014 season.

Records vs in-state rivalsDivision 1, non-SoCon onlyNotable seasons

1926–27 The Citadel Bulldogs basketball team - first and only Conference Tournament championship
1966–67 The Citadel Bulldogs basketball team - Chronicled in Pat Conroy's My Losing Season''
1978–79 The Citadel Bulldogs basketball team - first 20 win season
2008–09 The Citadel Bulldogs basketball team - second 20 win season; first postseason appearance

References

External links